"Mansion Over the Hilltop" is a Southern Gospel song written by Ira Stanphill, written in 1949.  It was most notably performed by Elvis Presley on the album His Hand in Mine.

References

Elvis Presley songs
Year of song missing
Gospel songs
1949 songs